The Briggs are a punk rock band based out of Los Angeles, California. The band formed in 1999 under the name "I Decline" by brothers Joey and Jason LaRocca and bassist Matthew Stolarz (a.k.a. Duck). In 2001, with the addition of drummer Chris Arredondo (a.k.a. Chris X) the band adopted the name The Briggs. Since the band started touring, they have shared the stage with the likes of Dropkick Murphys, Bad Religion, Anti-Flag, and Flogging Molly. They have also been involved with The Vans Warped Tour in 2002, 2004, 2007, and 2008. The Briggs released their fourth full-length album, Come All You Madmen, on SideOneDummy Records on June 17, 2008.  Their song "This is LA" is played as part of the introduction for the Los Angeles Galaxy and the Los Angeles Kings at all of their home games.
Their song "Harder To Stand" from the album Back to Higher Ground was featured in the soundtrack to the film Big Stan (2008).
After a short hiatus, the band returned to the studio in 2012 and will be releasing the song and video for "Panic" on May 1, 2012.
In the Spring of 2015, The Briggs released a new self-titled 4 song EP.  It was self-released by the band on 7", and the CD and digital download version included their previously released single "Panic".
In 2022 a documentary titled "Gridlocked: On Tour with The Briggs" which covered the 2015 west coast tour was released by Gravitas Ventures.

Band members
Current members
Jason LaRocca - vocals, guitars
Joey LaRocca - vocals, guitars
Jake Margolis  - drums, percussion
Derik Envy - bass
Trevor Jackson - additional guitar

Past Members
Chris Arredondo - drums
Alex Patterson - bass/vox
Matthew "Duck" Stolarz - bass/vox (1999–2003)
Omar Espinosa - bass/vox (2003–2004)
Ben Crockett - bass/vox (2004–2005)
Charlie Curtis - bass/vox
Richard Sanchez - bass/vox
Ryan Roberts - bass/vox
Jake Margolis- drums (2009–2010)

Discography

Studio albums
Is This What You Believe (2001, Northeast Records)
Numbers (2003, Disaster Records)
Back to Higher Ground (2006, SideOneDummy Records)
Come All You Madmen (2008, SideOneDummy Records)

EPs
Leaving The Ways EP (2004, SideOneDummy Records)
The Westlake Sessions EP (2007, SideOneDummy Records)
The Briggs EP (2015, This Is LA Records)

Music videos
 Bored Teenager (2003)
 One Shot Down (2004)
 Wasting Time (2006)
 Charge Into the Sun (2008)
 Panic! (2012)
Punks in Vegas Sessions (2015)

Films
 Gridlocked: On Tour with The Briggs (2022)

References

External links
The Briggs' Official Website

Musical groups from Los Angeles
Street punk groups

Celtic punk groups
SideOneDummy Records artists
Musical groups established in 1999
Musical groups established in 2001
Punk rock groups from California
1999 establishments in California